Mercenaries' Trap is a 1981 Romanian adventure drama war film, directed by Sergiu Nicolaescu.

Cast

 Gheorghe Cozorici – baron colonel von Görtz
 Sergiu Nicolaescu – major Tudor Andrei 
 Mircea Albulescu – captain Luca
 Ion Besoiu – captain Lemeni
 Amza Pellea – mercenary Frank 
 Jean Constantin – Hans
 Colea Răutu – cavalry sergeant Ion Ailenei 
  – Genovese mercenary
  – mercenary
 Șerban Ionescu – Mitru, Luca's brother

  – lieutenant Dumitru Ionescu
  – toothless mercenary
 Constantin Codrescu – director of the poker club
 Mircea Gogan – Wilhelm
 George Mihăiță – Onuț, Luca's brother 
 Violeta Andrei – countess Esther, wife of baron von Görtz
 Ileana Popovici – young peasant woman
 Enikõ Szilágyi – lover of the poker club's director
 Ion Anestin
 Ion Marinescu – priest

 Ion Pascu  
 Alexandru Rioșanu 
 Vasile Popa 
 Ion Pall
 Dumitru Crăciun  
 Adrian Ștefănescu 
 Mihai Adrian
 Doru Dumitrescu
 Ion Polizache 
 Alexandru Dobrescu – Romanian colonel
 Vasile Boghiță

References

External links
 

1981 films
1980s Romanian-language films
Films set in 1918
German World War I films
Films directed by Sergiu Nicolaescu
Romanian historical films
1980s German films
Romanian World War I films
World War I films set on the Eastern Front